All the Way was an Australian television series made by Crawford Productions for the Nine Network in 1988.

The series was set in the 1960s. The first episode took place on the date of the John F. Kennedy assassination. The series examined the life of an Australian family during the decade of Lyndon B. Johnson, the Vietnam War, civil rights activism and The Beatles, linked by three sisters (played by Diana Davidson, Maggie Millar and Rowena Wallace).

A young Dannii Minogue was in the cast. All the Way started as a six-part TV mini-series during April 1988 before being extended to an ongoing series during the Summer non-ratings period which was very unfortunate for the TV series during its regular time-slot scheduling changes due often to the summer cricket telecasts did not help the success of the series either.

It was a TV mini series before a 22 part episode series. The series screened out of ratings period starting in November 1988.

It failed to catch on with audiences and was cancelled after 32 episodes.

Cast
Brenda Addie as Mrs. Birch
Bruce Atkins 		
Kim Beissel as Medical student
Nikki Coghill as Terry O'Rourke
Vince Colosimo as Joe Bianchi
Ralph Cotterill as Mr. Bower
Diana Davidson as Madeleine
Joe Dolce as Franco
Brenton Foale 	as Journalist
Stephen Hall as Richard Dodds
Marion Heathfield as Mrs. Hart
Lisa Hensley as Christine Scott
Jim Howes as Professor Thompson
John Lee as Sir Peter Edwin
George Mallaby as George Cutler
Robert Mammone as Mr. Bianchi
Dominic McDonald as Barry Scott
Jacqueline McKenzie as Penelope Seymour
Ben Mendelsohn as Lindsay Seymour
Maggie Millar as Lorna Scott
Dennis Miller as Ray Scott
Dannii Minogue as Penny Seymour
Martin Redpath as Dr. Hart
Marie Redshaw as Miss McKinnon
Wyn Roberts as Maynard
Martin Sacks as Alan Scott
Joy Smithers as Gillian Porter
Peter Sumner as Phillip Seymour
Grigor Taylor as Mike O'Brien
Rowena Wallace as Elaine Seymour
Tim Burns as Student

Reception
The Age called it "awful".

References

External links
 
 Crawford Productions
All the Way at the National Film and Sound Archive

1988 Australian television series debuts
1988 Australian television series endings
Australian television soap operas
Television series by Crawford Productions
Nine Network original programming
Television series set in the 1960s
English-language television shows